Holy Ghost Ukrainian Church is a Ukrainian Greek Catholic church in Whitney Pier, a neighbourhood of Sydney, Nova Scotia. Founded in 1912, the parish serves the Ukrainian community in Cape Breton. It is the only Ukrainian Greek Catholic church in Canada east of Montreal. Holy Ghost is a parish in the Montreal-Ottawa deanery of the Ukrainian Catholic Eparchy of Toronto and Eastern Canada. The church was designated a Nova Scotian heritage property in 1984.

References

External links
Canada's Historic Places - Holy Ghost Ukrainian Church
Beaton Institute - Holy Ghost Church

Ukrainian Catholic churches in Canada
Heritage sites in Nova Scotia
Buildings and structures in the Cape Breton Regional Municipality
Churches in Nova Scotia